Kashmir Goth is a town in the Sindh province of Pakistan.

Populated places in Sindh